Ministry of Emergency Situations is a ministry in several countries:

 Ministry of Emergency Situations (Armenia)
 Ministry of Emergency Situations (Azerbaijan)
 Ministry of Emergency Situations (Belarus)
 Ministry of Emergency Management-Chinese Ministry
 Ministry of Emergency Situations (Kazakhstan)
 Ministry of Emergency Situations (Kyrgyzstan)
 Ministry of Emergency Situations (Russia)
 Committee of Emergency Situations and Civil Defense of Tajikistan
 State Emergency Service of Ukraine
 Ministry of Emergency Situations (Uzbekistan)

See also
 Federal Emergency Management Agency in the United States
 National Emergency Management Agency (disambiguation)